Hatti may refer to
Hatti (Assyrian )  in Bronze Age Anatolia:
the area of Hattusa, roughly delimited by the Halys bend
the Hattians of the 3rd and 2nd millennia BC
the Hittites of ca 1400–1200 BC
the areas to the west of the Euphrates controlled by Neo-Hittite kingdoms (1000–700 BC)

Places
Hatti, Raichur, a settlement in the Raichur district of Karnataka, India
Hatti, Davanagere, a settlement in the Davanagere district of Karnataka, India
Hatti District, an administrative subdivision of Iran

See also
Hati (disambiguation)
Hattian (disambiguation)
Hattie (disambiguation)